The name Rama's Bridge or Rama Setu (Sanskrit; setu: bridge) refers to the bridge built by the Vanara army of Lord Rama in Ramayana, with instructions from Nala, which he used to reach Lanka and rescue Sita from the Rakshasa king, Ravana. The Ramayana attributes the building of this bridge to Rama in verse 2-22-76, naming it as Setubandhanam, a name that persists until today.

In the memory of Sethubandhan, Thriprayar Sree Ramaswamy temple (Trichur District) observes "Sethubandhan" in every year. This is celebrated as a festival on "Thiruvonam" day in the Malayalam Month"Kanni" (October – November) in every year.

See also
 Sethubandhanam at Sreeraman Chira Chemmappilly
 Thriprayar Temple
 Nalambalam

References

Rama temples
Hindu temples in Thrissur district